The Stadslagen (City Law), was a Swedish law passed by king Magnus IV of Sweden in circa 1350. It governed the life in the cities of Sweden until 1734. 

The Stadslagen was passed by in about the same time as the Magnus Erikssons landslag (Country Law of Magnus Eriksson), and as the former was to apply in the country side, the city law was to apply in the cities. The law was strongly influenced by the contemporary German city laws, as the Swedish cities at the time had many German settlers.   

In 1442, the country law was succeeded by the Kristofers landslag, but the city law was merely incorporated in this and left unaltered and uncontested. It was printed in 1618. It was in effect in Sweden-Finland until the Civil Code of 1734. 

The name Stadslag is also used as a common name for the other city laws issued in Medieval Sweden.

References

 Nationalencyklopedin (NE)

1350s in law
Political history of Sweden
14th century in Sweden
Legal history of Sweden
Legal history of Finland
1350 in Europe